Carles Magraner is a Spanish musician. He was born on November 16, 1962 in Almussafes (province of Valencia) and studied music at Carcaixent, the Conservatorio Superior de Valencia (cello and musicology), Conservatoire Toulouse and Amsterdam (viola de arco). He is a professor of cello and viola da gamba, though most of his professional work is done with the group Capella de Ministrers, which he founded in Valencia in 1987 and of which he is still director.

References

External links

Capella de Ministrers

1962 births
Living people
People from Ribera Baixa
Musicians from the Valencian Community
Spanish musicians
String musicians
University of Salamanca